Emperor Norton Records was a Los Angeles-based electronica, hip-hop, and dance-music record label.  Among the artists featured on the label were Ladytron, Arling & Cameron, Money Mark, Ugly Duckling, and Fantastic Plastic Machine.  Additionally, it released the soundtracks to movies including Lost in Translation, CQ  and The Virgin Suicides.

The company was named after Joshua A. Norton, a San Francisco citizen noted for proclaiming himself Emperor of the United States and Protector of Mexico in 1859. The record label was founded by Peter Getty, and the company was purchased by Rykodisc in 2004 and was then acrimoniously shut down later that year, with Rykodisc inheriting its back-catalog.

On March 23, 2006, it was announced that Warner Music Group acquired the Ryko Corporation for $67.5 million.

Artists
Air
Arling and Cameron
Buffalo Daughter
Bertrand Burgalat
Call & Response
Cato Salsa Experience
Cinemaphonic: Electro Soul
Codec and Flexor
Cords
DJ Me DJ You
Electrocute
Fantastic Plastic Machine
Felix Da Housecat
Golden Boy
Green Romance Orchestra
Bruce Haack
Ladytron
Logan's Sanctuary
The Maxwell Implosion
Midnight Movies
Takako Minekawa
Miss Kittin
Money Mark
Mount Sims
Ralph Myerz and the Jack Herren Band
Olivia Tremor Control
Pepe Deluxé
Permafrost
Phaser
Schroeder's Cat
Senor Coconut
Soul Ecstasy
Sunshine Fix
Titán
Ugly Duckling
The Upper Crust
Velma
The Virgin-Whore Complex
Zoobombs

Soundtracks
CQ
Lost in Translation
Thinking XXX
The Virgin Suicides

See also
 List of record labels

References

External links
 

American record labels
Electronic music record labels
Electronic dance music record labels
Hip hop record labels
Warner Music labels